The .500 Bushwhacker is a .50 caliber semi-rimmed revolver cartridge developed by TII Armory for the Magnum Research BFR revolvers. It is currently the most powerful revolver cartridge in the world, offering a similar level of ballistic performance to African stopping rifles, such as the .416 Rigby and .470 Nitro Express. Given comparable barrel lengths, it is nearly twice as powerful as the .500 S&W Magnum.

Cartridge history

Brothers James Tow and Keith Tow of Halsey, Oregon developed the .500 Bushwhacker in 2021 to produce a repeating handgun capable of ethically harvesting dangerous game. They initially used the .375 Ruger for a parent case, fireforming the brass cylindrical and threading the bases for rims. The result was a cartridge that is essentially a lengthened .500 S&W Magnum. New manufactured brass is now produced by the Bertram Bullet Company.

Design, specifications, and use

The .500 Bushwhacker is designed to operate at comparable chamber pressures to the .500 S&W Magnum. Since the case is simply a lengthened version of the .500 S&W, the cylinder wall thickness remains the same on a firearm converted to the larger cartridge. Accordingly, the same pressure level can safely be maintained in firearms capable of accommodating the additional cartridge length. Firearms converted to the .500 Bushwhacker are also capable of firing .500 S&W, .500 JRH, and .500 S&W Special ammunition. 

To ensure manageable recoil in converted revolvers, all .500 Bushwhacker conversions produced by TII Armory include the installation of a rifle-style muzzle brake.

Since the .500 Bushwhacker is capable of firing equivalent weight bullets at nearly twice the velocity of other large bore handgun cartridges, such as the .480 Ruger and .500 Linebaugh, it is advisable that monometal bullets be used for dangerous game hunting, so as to guard against bullet failures. Commercial loadings of the .500 Bushwhacker outperform all rifle loadings of .45-70 Government, making the cartridge not only the most powerful revolver round but also very powerful by rifle standards.

See also
 12 mm caliber
 List of handgun cartridges
 Table of handgun and rifle cartridges

Footnotes

References 

 “The .500 Bushwhacker: Do You Feel Lucky?” " by William Lawson
 "The .500 Bushwhacker: Do You Feel Lucky?" " by William Lawson
 "Wheelgun Wednesday: New .500 Bushwhacker Cartridge for BFR Revolvers by TII Armory " by Hrachya Hayrapetyan
 "Wheelgun Wednesday: New .500 Bushwhacker Cartridge for BFR Revolvers by TII Armory " by Hrachya Hayrapetyan
 "Making Harry’s Day: The .500 Bushwhacker Story" 
 "Making Harry’s Day: The .500 Bushwhacker Story" 
" by James Tow

Pistol and rifle cartridges
Magnum pistol cartridges
Weapons and ammunition introduced in 2022